Christianity is the most widely professed religion in South Sudan, with significant minorities of the adherents of traditional African religions and Islam. 

President Salva Kiir, a Catholic, while speaking at Saint Theresa Cathedral in Juba, stated that South Sudan would be a nation which respects freedom of religion. The reported estimated relative proportions of adherents of traditional African religions and Christianity have varied. A 2019 study found that Protestants outnumbered Catholics in South Sudan.

History 
Christianity has a long history in the region that is now South Sudan. Ancient Nubia was reached by Coptic Christianity by the 2nd century, and missionary activity from Ethiopia consolidated that community. In 1920, the Protestant Church Missionary Society originated a diocese.

Religious membership 
In the early 1990s, official records of Sudan as a whole (Sudan and South Sudan) showed that a large percentage adhered to African Traditional Religion (17%) and Christianity (8%) (though both located mainly in the south, some also at Khartoum). Among Christians, most are Catholic and Anglican, though other denominations are also active, and African Traditional Religion beliefs are often blended with Christian beliefs.

In addition to news sources, the Anglican and Catholic churches claim large membership. The Anglican Communion claimed 2 million members in 2005 in the Episcopal Church of the Sudan. The third largest denomination in South Sudan is the Presbyterian Church in Sudan.

The most recent Pew Research Center on Religion and Public Life report from December 2012 estimated that in 2010, there were 6.010 million Christians (60.46%), 3.270 million followers of African Traditional Religion (32.9%), 610,000 Muslims (6.2%) and 50,000 unaffiliated (no known religion) of a total 9,940,000 people in South Sudan.

These figures are also disputed as the Pew Research Center on Religion and Public Life report cites 'The United Nations provided the Pew Forum with special estimates for Sudan and the new nation of South Sudan'. The UN does not have any official figures on ethnicity and religion outside National Census figures.

In 2022 the new Catholic bishop of Rumbek, Christian Carlassare, stated that "More than half the population of South Sudan is Christian, only 8% are Muslim. Other groups live on the margins, and have not drawn close to the Gospel. However, we live in a country where Christianity is often no more than skin deep, it hasn’t grown roots in the life of the population."

See also 
 Catholicism in South Sudan
 Province of the Episcopal Church of South Sudan and Sudan
 Islam in South Sudan

References

Sources